Campbell John Poore Smith (born 21 March 1960), sometimes known as John Smith, is a former New Zealand cricketer who played 62 first-class and 22 List A matches for Central Districts between 1984 and 1991. He also played for Nelson in the Hawke Cup. Smith was born at Nelson.

References

1960 births
Living people
New Zealand cricketers
Central Districts cricketers
Cricketers from Nelson, New Zealand